The Hibbing Daily Tribune newspaper was founded in Hibbing, Saint Louis County, Minnesota in 1893 and serves readers in Saint Louis County.  It is published daily, except Monday, with a circulation of 3,749 in 2019.  The newspaper is currently owned by the Adams Publishing Group.

History
The Hibbing Daily Tribune is a successor to the following newspapers:
 Hibbing Daily News (Hibbing, Saint Louis County, Minn.) 1922-1927
 The Hibbing tribune (Hibbing, Minn.) 1899-1910

See also
List of newspapers in Minnesota

References

Newspapers published in Minnesota
Hibbing, Minnesota
Newspapers established in 1893
1893 establishments in Minnesota